The 1968 Virginia Cavaliers football team represented the University of Virginia during the 1968 NCAA University Division football season. The Cavaliers were led by fourth-year head coach George Blackburn and played their home games at Scott Stadium in Charlottesville, Virginia. They competed as members of the Atlantic Coast Conference, finishing in third. Virginia's record of 7–3 represented the school's best record and first winning season since 1952, and the school's best finish in conference since joining the ACC in 1954. The team's star was running back Frank Quayle, who set the conference single-season rushing record with 1,213 yards and was named ACC Player of the Year. Blackburn was named ACC Coach of the Year.

Schedule

References

Virginia
Virginia Cavaliers football seasons
Virginia Cavaliers football